Chapada da Natividade is a municipality located in the Brazilian state of Tocantins. Its population was 3,331 (2020) and its area is 1,671 km².

References

Municipalities in Tocantins